Chaminade Julienne Catholic High School is a private, co-educational, center-city, Catholic high school. It is located in downtown Dayton, in the U.S. state of Ohio, and is owned and operated by the Society of Mary and the Sisters of Notre Dame de Namur. It is named after Blessed William Joseph Chaminade and St. Julie Billiart.

History
In 1886, the Sisters of Notre Dame de Namur founded Notre Dame Academy in downtown Dayton, a private secondary school for girls. In 1927, the Sisters were forced to move to a larger facility, and Julienne High School was formed in honor of the founder of the sisterhood, St. Julie Billiart.

The Society of Mary, founded by Blessed William Joseph Chaminade, founded St. Mary's Institute in 1850, with both secondary and college level programs.  St. Mary's became the University of Dayton in 1920.  With the Sisters leaving the downtown Dayton site, the Marianists purchased the old Notre Dame Academy building and opened Chaminade High School, a Catholic high school for boys.

Because enrollment decreased as times changed, the two schools merged in 1973 to create Chaminade Julienne High School. CJ students come from 45 different grade schools and more than 50 zip codes.

Athletics
Chaminade Julienne's athletic program has been very competitive in city, regional, and state contests since the school's founding. The school's mascot is the Eagle, and its colors are blue and green. The boys' teams compete in the Greater Catholic League and the girls' teams compete in the Girls' Greater Catholic League.

Chaminade Julienne High School began playing football in 1927. Gerard "Fuzzy" Faust became the head coach in 1933 and would go on to coach 21 seasons (1933-1952, 1956). Faust became the winningest coach in school history, with a record of 123-49-10. The Eagles rose to dominance in the 1940s and 1950s. Over a 20-year span (1940-1959), the "Men of Chaminade" won 16 City League championship and compiled a record of 138-38-9.

In 1966 and 1970, the basketball team, led by coach Jim Turvene, won the large school Division State Championships. Forward Dan Gerhard, 1970 team member, earned Ohio Player of the Year honors. The 1970 the baseball team, led by coach Rick Wessels, won the large school Division State Championship. Center fielder Paul Kurpiel earned Ohio Baseball Player of the Year honors> The 1970 Baseball Team is the only Dayton school to win the large school division baseball State Championship.

In 1982, the Chaminade Julienne men's soccer team brought home the state championship, and the women's volleyball team became a perennial powerhouse, earning multiple district and regional titles for several years. In 1991, the men's basketball team was state runner-up. Both the cross country and track teams produced championships in 1993 and 1994, and the women's basketball team took CJ to the state tournament in 1998 for the first time in the school's history. Returning to state the next year, the women's basketball team brought home the 1999 State Division II championship title. The women's team returned to state and won the State Division II Championship again in 2003. In 2004 they were Division I State Runner-up and returned in 2005 to win the Division I State Championship.

In 2002 the football team, led by Coach Jim Place, made history by being the first team from Dayton to win the State Championship (D-II). The girls' basketball team once again captured the state championship title in 2003 and 2005. They were also recognized as the number one girls' high school basketball team by USA Today.

In 2005, the women's tennis team made its first trip ever to the OHSAA state tournament. It placed fourth in state, and boasted three individual players also going to state and reaching the quarterfinals.  The graduating class of 2005 had five students receive division I athletic scholarships. In 2006, the girls' team was back at state again, and placed third in the OHSAA tournament. In 2006, CJ sent four players to the state tournament, three of whom reached the tournament in 2005. These were two sets of sisters: the Pleiman and Buerschen sisters. In 2007, the team placed third again in the division one state championships. Four players qualified for the individual state tournament.

In 2009, the boys' volleyball team, led by coach Megan Marrinan, went to the Division II state tournament for the first time in the school's history. They lost in the semi-finals in five games. Ethan Klosterman was named first team all state and Christian Volk made honorable mention all state.

In the spring of 2011, senior track athlete Bryan Cain won an individual Division II state championship in the 300-meter hurdles event. He also finished third in the 110 meter hurdles, after breaking regional records in both events leading up to the finals.

In October 2011, the Division II women's golf team — having existed for all of five years (since 2007) — became the first Eagles golf team to win a state title since 1933, when the boys of Chaminade High School were crowned city and state champs.

In spring of 2012, senior track athlete Cierra Brown won two individual Division II state titles in the 100-meter and 300-meter hurdle events. She also finished second in the long jump.

In June 2018, the Chaminade Julienne Eagles baseball team won the OHSAA Division II state tournament. The following year (2019) Chaminade Julienne Eagles baseball team completed their quest for back to back by again taking home the OHSAA Division II state tournament championship.

Chaminade Julienne has a longstanding academic and athletic rivalry with Archbishop Alter High School.

Ohio High School Athletic Association State Championships

 Boys' Football – 2002
 Boys' Basketball - 1966, 1970
 Boys' Baseball - 1970,2018,  2019
 Boys' Soccer - 1982
 Boys' Golf - 1929, 1933
 Girls' Basketball - 1999, 2003, 2005
 Girls' Golf - 2011

Notable alumni

Athletics

Derrick Brown – basketball player, Charlotte Bobcats (NBA)
Megan Duffy – basketball player (WNBA)
Gerry Faust – head football coach, University of Notre Dame
Ron Hunter – college basketball coach
Gary Kosins – football player (NFL)
Brandon McKinney – football player (NFL)
Tamika Raymond (née Williams) – basketball player (WNBA)
Javon Ringer – football player (NFL)
Jerry Smith - football player (NFL)

Clergy
Paul Francis Leibold – Archbishop of Cincinnati
Dorothy Stang - member of Sisters of Notre Dame de Namur, martyred environmental and anti-poverty activist

Education
Roderick J. McDavis - first African-American president of Ohio University
Historic Preservation
Jerry Sharkey - Wright brothers historian
Media

Joe Estevez – screen actor, director, and producer
Mike Gallagher - radio personality
Amy Schneider – Jeopardy! champion, and the first openly transgender contestant to qualify for the Tournament of Champions
Martin Sheen – screen actor
Candace Smith – actress, Miss Ohio (2003)

Military
Maj. Gen. John D. Altenburg – U.S. Army head of military commissions

Notes and references

External links
http://www.cjeagles.org

Catholic secondary schools in Ohio
Educational institutions established in 1973
Educational institutions established in 1850
High schools in Dayton, Ohio
1850 establishments in Ohio
Marianist schools
Sisters of Notre Dame de Namur schools
Roman Catholic Archdiocese of Cincinnati